James William Charles Pennington ( – October 22, 1870) was an American abolitionist, orator, minister and writer active in Brooklyn, New York. He escaped at the age of 19 from slavery in western Maryland and reached New York. After working in Brooklyn and gaining some education, he was the first African American allowed to attend classes at Yale University, though he was not allowed to formally enroll. He was ordained as a minister in the Congregational Church, later also serving in Presbyterian churches for congregations in Hartford, Connecticut; and New York. After the Civil War, he served congregations in Natchez, Mississippi; Portland, Maine; and Jacksonville, Florida.

In the Antebellum period, Pennington was an abolitionist, and among the American delegates to the Second World Conference on Slavery in London. In 1850, he happened to be in Scotland when the Fugitive Slave Act was passed by the US Congress. As it increased the risk for fugitive slaves in the North, Pennington stayed in the British Isles while friends worked to buy his freedom from his former master and then from his estate. Pennington raised funds for the abolition movement on the public lecture circuit in England.

Pennington wrote and published what is considered the first history of blacks in the United States, The Origin and History of the Colored People (1841). His memoir, The Fugitive Blacksmith, was first published in 1849 in London.

Early life and education
James was born into slavery in 1807, at a Tilghman plantation on the Eastern Shore of Maryland.  When he was four years old, James and his mother were given to Frisby Tilghman, their master's son, as a wedding gift. They were taken by the younger Tilghman to his new plantation called Rockland, near Hagerstown in western Maryland. There James was trained as a carpenter and blacksmith. On October 28, 1827, at the age of nineteen, James escaped from the plantation, leaving behind his parents and eleven siblings.

After a series of misadventures James reached Adams County, Pennsylvania, where he was taken in by the Quakers William and Phoebe Wright. They were glad to assist the fugitive from slavery, and began to teach him to read and write, as well as paying him wages for his work. As James was illiterate, Wright began to teach him to read and write. James adopted the middle name "William" after his benefactor, and the surname "Pennington," after Isaac Penington, an English man who was prominent in Quaker history.

Move to New York
Moving north to Brooklyn, New York, a year later in 1828, Pennington found work as a coachman for a wealthy lawyer. He continued his education, paying tutors out of his earnings, and teaching himself Latin and Greek. New York's law for gradual abolition of slavery did not completely free all adults until 1827. In the early 1800s Kings County and Brooklyn on Long Island still had many enslaved laborers, as they were important to the agricultural economy of the area at the time.

Pennington attended the first Negro National Convention in Philadelphia in 1829. He continued to be active in the Negro Convention movement, becoming its presiding officer in 1853.  Within five years he had learned so much that he was hired to teach school in Newtown (present-day Elmhurst, Queens, in western Long Island).

He also became involved in the Shiloh Presbyterian Church, Manhattan. Wanting more education, he was allowed to audit classes at Yale University, though with the proviso that he must sit in the back of the room and not ask questions. After completing his studies in the Yale Divinity School, Pennington was ordained to the ministry of the Congregational Church. He first served a congregation on Long Island, probably in Queens.

It is important to note that Pennington was never formally accepted as a student at Yale University in the 1830s. He was allowed to attend classes, but he could not participate as a student, nor did he ever receive any degree or certificate at Yale. It was not until 2016 that the Yale Divinity School honored Pennington by renaming a classroom in his honor.

The first Black student to receive a degree at Yale University was Richard Henry Green, in 1857.

Next Pennington was called in 1840 by the Talcott Street Church (now called Faith Congregational Church) in Hartford, Connecticut. While serving as minister, Pennington wrote what is believed to be the first history of African Americans, The Origin and History of the Colored People (1841), drawing on current works of the time.

He became deeply involved in the abolition movement. He was selected as a delegate to the Second World Conference on Slavery in London. While in England, he had been invited by churches to preach and serve communion as a matter of course as a visiting minister. After returning to Hartford, he told his white colleagues about this and persuaded them to include him in their pulpit exchanges. On this circuit, he was the first black pastor to preach in a number of Connecticut churches.

He became friends with John Hooker, one of his parishioners, confiding in him in 1844 his status as a fugitive slave and concern about his future. Hooker opened secret negotiations for purchase with his former owner, Frisby Tilghman. Hooker and Pennington did not then have the $500 demanded by the master, who died soon after.

Pennington was among those in the late 1830s who became involved in seeking justice for West African Mende people illegally taken in slavery. After they mutinied and sailed their ship to Long Island, they were taken into custody by the United States. Spain, the ship's owners, the US and the Mende, all had roles in the complex case. In the Amistad case, which was litigated from 1839 to 1841, the courts were called on to determine whether the Mende were the property of the ship's owners, or of Spain, or free. It was ultimately settled by the United States Supreme Court, which ruled in favor of the Mende, saying that as free men (since the African slave trade had been banned), they had the right to defend themselves and try to regain their freedom. When the West Africans won their case and freedom, thirty-five chose to return to Africa. Pennington formed the United Missionary Society, the first black missionary society, to help raise funds for their return.

Pennington happened to be in Scotland when the Fugitive Slave Law of 1850 was passed, which increased the risk to him as a fugitive from the South. It required even law enforcement and officials in such free states as New York to cooperate in the capture and prosecution of fugitive slaves, and was biased in favor of slave catchers and masters. Bounties were offered for slaves' capture and documentation requirements were light, making it easy for slave catchers even to take free persons. Although Pennington was called to New York in 1850 to serve the Shiloh Presbyterian Church, he feared returning while at such risk.  Hooker worked with abolitionists in England to raise money to purchase Pennington from Tilghman's estate (the planter had died). Friends of Pennington in Dunse, Berwickshire raised the funds. Hooker briefly took legal "ownership" of Pennington in order to legally manumit him in New York.

While remaining in the British Isles for nearly two years for his safety, Pennington traveled widely there and in Europe, speaking and raising money for the abolition cause. He had completed his memoir, entitled The Fugitive Blacksmith, which was first published in 1849 in London. This slave narrative recounted his journey from slavery to the status of educated minister. While in Europe, Pennington was awarded an honorary doctorate by the University of Heidelberg, the first African American to be so honored.

After returning to the United States, Pennington helped form a committee to protest the segregation of the New York City (including Brooklyn) street car system. Schoolteacher Elizabeth Jennings had been arrested in 1854 for using a street car reserved for whites. Several private companies operated all the street cars; they required blacks to sit in segregated seating. Defended by young attorney Chester A. Arthur, Jennings won her case in February 1855 in the Brooklyn Circuit Court, after a three-day trial covered by the New York Times.

When Pennington was arrested and convicted in 1859 for riding in a "white only" street car operated by another company, he was represented by the Legal Rights Association. It had been formed by Elizabeth's father Thomas L. Jennings. He challenged the system successfully and on appeal, gained an 1855 ruling by the State Supreme Court that such racial segregation was illegal and must end. By 1865, after starts and stops, all the street car companies had desegregated their systems.

Civil War and after
Pennington identified as a pacifist, but during the American Civil War (1861-1865), he helped recruit black troops for the Union Army.  When the war was over, he served for a short time as a minister in Natchez, Mississippi. Next he was called to Portland, Maine, where he served for three years.

Early in 1870, he returned to the South, where he had been appointed by the Presbyterian Church to serve in Florida. He organized an African-American congregation in Jacksonville. He died there on October 22, 1870, after a short illness.

Legacy and honors
In 1849 the University of Heidelberg awarded Pennington an honorary doctorate of divinity. The university has created the James W.C. Pennington Award in his honor. It is given to scholars who have done distinguished work on topics important to Pennington. The first recipient was Albert J. Raboteau. The award has also gone to Evelyn Brooks Higginbotham, Laurie Maffly-Kipp and William L. Andrews.

Works

The Origin and History of the Colored People (1841), considered the first history of African Americans. He directly challenged published statements by former President Thomas Jefferson as to the "inferiority" of black people.
The Fugitive Blacksmith (1849), his memoir, a slave narrative, was published first in London.

See also
List of African-American abolitionists

References

Bibliography
Nichols, Charles. Black Men in Chains: Narratives by Escaped Slaves. New York: Hill & Wang, 1972
, text online at Documenting the American South, University of North Carolina
 Volk, Kyle G. (2014). Moral Minorities and the Making of American Democracy. New York: Oxford University Press. pp. 148–166. .

Further reading

External links
James W.C. Pennington, Spartacus Educational
 
 

1800s births
1870 deaths
African-American abolitionists
People from Washington County, Maryland
People from Littlestown, Pennsylvania
Fugitive American slaves
Colored Conventions people
Yale University alumni
People who wrote slave narratives
People from Brooklyn
American Congregationalist ministers
19th-century Congregationalist ministers
American expatriates in the United Kingdom
African-American college graduates before 1865
African-American Christian clergy
Congregationalist abolitionists
Underground Railroad in New York (state)
African-American history in New York City
African-American historians
19th-century American clergy